Hamilton Dibble Jessup (May 2, 1806 – 1892) was a doctor and political figure in Canada West.

He was the son of Edward Jessup, Jr. and the grandson of Edward Jessup, a United Empire Loyalist. He studied medicine in Montreal and opened a practice in Prescott, Ontario. He served 10 terms as mayor and was lieutenant-colonel in the local militia, participating in the Battle of the Windmill. He represented Grenville in the 2nd Parliament of the Province of Canada. He was customs collector at Prescott from 1867 to 1885.

His older brother, Edward Jessup III, represented Grenville in the Legislative Assembly of Upper Canada.

External links
Biographical sketch at Canadian Archival Information Network

1806 births
1892 deaths
Members of the Legislative Assembly of the Province of Canada from Canada West
Physicians from Ontario
Mayors of places in Ontario